Jaran Ditapichai is a Thai political scientist, educator, writer, political activist, and advocate of human rights.

Biography 
Jaran was born in Phatthalung, Thailand. He was a student leader during the 6 October 1976 massacre of student protesters and thereafter fled to join the Communist Party of Thailand, adopting the nom de guerre "สหายแผ้ว" (Comrade "Paew" – or Comrade Clarity).

He was a member of the Thai National Human Rights Commission, but was expelled on 26 September 2007 by the National Legislative Assembly, which had been installed by the military junta that had taken power in the 2006 coup.

Jaran fled to France after the 2014 military coup. The government of France granted Jaran and other lèse majesté suspects a refugee status in 2015.

Education
 BA – Faculty of Political Science, Thammasat University
 MA – Department of History, University of Paris 7
 Post Graduate Studies – Political Philosophy, University of Paris 1 (Sorbonne)

Work
 1990 – 2000 – Assistant Professor on the Faculty of Social Sciences at Rangsit University
 1998 – 2000 – Chairman of the Union for Civil Liberty
 2001 – 2006 – Member of the National Human Rights Commission

Publications
 Jaran's works include reporting on the methods and works of public hearings in Thai society (with Faculty)
 report : "On the Restructuring of the Thai Parliament"
 book : "The French Revolution", Volumes 1 & 2
 book : "Leading up to 14 October"
 book : "From Ratchadamnoern to Shwedagong"
 book : "A Citizen's handbook on Human Rights"
 book : "On the Path Toward Human Rights"

Academic rank
 Assistant Professor

References 

1947 births
Jaran Ditapichai
Jaran Ditapichai
Living people
Refugees in France
Jaran Ditapichai
Jaran Ditapichai
Jaran Ditapichai
Jaran Ditapichai
Jaran Ditapichai
Jaran Ditapichai
Jaran Ditapichai
Jaran Ditapichai
Jaran Ditapichai
Jaran Ditapichai
Jaran Ditapichai
Jaran Ditapichai